Richard Holton is a British philosopher and Professor of Philosophy at the University of Cambridge and a fellow of Peterhouse. He is known for his works on moral psychology and action theory. Holton is a Fellow of the British Academy.

Books
 Willing, Wanting, Waiting, Oxford University Press, 2009.

References

External links
Personal website

21st-century British philosophers
Philosophy academics
Living people
Fellows of the British Academy
Academics of the University of Cambridge
Princeton University alumni
Fellows of Peterhouse, Cambridge
Moral psychologists
Year of birth missing (living people)
Massachusetts Institute of Technology faculty